Martin Oehri (born 11 October 1964) is a Liechtensteiner former footballer who is last known to have played as a goalkeeper for SC St. Gallenkirch. He is a former Liechtenstein international.

Career

Oehri is considered to be a Liechtenstein national team legend.

He was former captain of Liechtenstein national team.

Oehri was voted 1992 Liechtensteiner Player of the Year.

He played for RW Rankweil.

He is a former Liechtenstein international.

References

External links
 

1964 births
Liechtenstein footballers
Liechtenstein international footballers
USV Eschen/Mauren players
SC Austria Lustenau players
Living people
Association football goalkeepers